Zabel is a feminine given name common in Armenia. It is derived from Isabella. It may refer to
Isabella, Queen of Armenia
Zabel Sibil Asadour (1863–1934), Armenian poet, writer, publisher, educator and philanthropist
Zabel Yesayan (1878–1943), Ottoman Armenian novelist and translator

See also 
Zabelle

Armenian feminine given names